The Women's 800 metre freestyle competition of the 2021 FINA World Swimming Championships (25 m) was held on 17 and 18 December 2021.

Records
Prior to the competition, the existing world and championship records were as follows.

The following new records were set during this competition:

Results

Heats
The heats were started on 17 December at 11:14.

Final
The final was held on 18 December at 19:41.

References

Women's 800 metre freestyle
2021 in women's swimming